Darko Kolić (born October 6, 1971) is a Serbian former footballer.

Playing career 
Kolić began his professional career in his hometown of Belgrade (near the Fontana neighborhood where he grew up) in 1992 – first with FK Rad in the First Division and then Hajduk Belgrade in  the Second Division.

He signed with the Montreal Impact in 1997 and played with the team until the end of the 2006 season, with stints in Richmond in 1998 and Long Island in 1999.

He tallied 17 goals and nine assists while playing for Long Island in 1999 and with that performance, he finished fourth in league scoring and earned a spot on the second all-star team. When he returned to the Impact in 2000, he finished first in team scoring with eight goals and four assists. With the Impact, he won the Montreal Cup, a six-team international tournament played at Complexe sportif Claude-Robillard in 2001, the league championship in 2004, as well as the regular-season title in 1997, 2005 and 2006.

In the 2007 season, he played for the Trois-Rivières (then the Impact farm team) in nineteen games, scoring sixteen goals. His contract was not renewed in December 2007 and he joined Vermont Voltage. For Vermont, Kolić appeared in eighteen games and notched fourteen goals.

Coaching career 
Kolić began his coaching career in 2007 when he was named assistant coach of the Concordia Stingers. In November, he left the Stingers and joined Vermont Voltage, becoming the assistant to Bo Simić.

In February 2011, Kolić was named technical director of FC Anjou located in the eastern part of the city of Montreal. He replaced another retired Impact player, Jason DiTullio, and was assisted by Impact players António Ribeiro, Reda Agourram and Hicham Aâboubou.

Honours
1997: Commissioner's Cup
2001: Montreal Cup
2002: Voyageurs Cup
2003: Voyageurs Cup
2003: Can Am Cup
2004: USL First Division Championship
2004: Voyageurs Cup
2004: Can Am Cup
2005: Commissioner's Cup
2005: Voyageurs Cup
2006: Commissioner's Cup
2006: Voyageurs Cup
2008: PASL MVP

Recreational
Kolić represented Canada at Quebec Calcetto Soccer League (QCSL) 2009 with sixteen games and thirty-four goals.

References

External links
Darko Soccer Academy - official site (archived)

1971 births
Living people
Footballers from Belgrade
FK Rad players
FK Hajduk Beograd players
Canadian Soccer League (1998–present) players
Expatriate soccer players in Canada
Expatriate soccer players in the United States
Association football forwards
Long Island Rough Riders players
Montreal Impact (1992–2011) players
Canadian people of Serbian descent
Richmond Kickers players
Serbian expatriate footballers
Serbian expatriate sportspeople in Canada
Serbian expatriate sportspeople in the United States
Serbian footballers
USL First Division players
USL League Two players
Trois-Rivières Attak players
Vermont Voltage players
A-League (1995–2004) players